Roberto Eliseo Sosa Echartea (born 14 June 1935, died 27 Jun 2008) is a Uruguayan football goalkeeper who played for Uruguay in the 1962 and 1966 FIFA World Cups. He also played for Club Nacional de Football.

References

External links
FIFA profile

1935 births
2008 deaths
Uruguayan footballers
Uruguayan expatriate footballers
Uruguay international footballers
Association football goalkeepers
Club Nacional de Football players
Universidad de Chile footballers
Deportes La Serena footballers
Uruguayan Primera División players
Chilean Primera División players
Expatriate footballers in Chile
1962 FIFA World Cup players
1966 FIFA World Cup players